The Hemlock Cup: Socrates, Athens, and the Search for the Good Life is a 2010 popular history book on the life of Socrates written by Bettany Hughes and published by Jonathan Cape.

References

Further reading

External links 
 
 Publisher website

2010 non-fiction books
Biographies about philosophers
Books about Greece
Jonathan Cape books
Works about Socrates